Megalorhipida deboeri is a species of moth in the genus Megalorhipida, known from Indonesia.

The specific name "deboeri" refers to A.L. de Boer, an entomologist who collected specimens of the species.

References 

Oxyptilini
Moths of Indonesia
Moths of Asia
Moths described in 2003
Endemic fauna of Indonesia